Teleorman County is a county (județ) of Romania on the border with Bulgaria, in the historical region Muntenia, with its capital city at Alexandria.

The name Teleorman is of Cumanic (Turkic) origin. It literally means crazy forest (Deli orman) and, by extension, "thick and shadowy forest" in the Cuman language. It can be encountered in other toponyms, such as the Turkish name of the Ludogorie Plateau in northeastern Bulgaria.

Demographics 

In 2011, the county had a population of 360,178 and the population density was 62.2/km².

 Romanians - 96.76%
 Romani - 3.18%
 Other minorities - 0.06%

Geography

Two distinctive elements can be found:
 In the North and center there are plains from the Romanian Plain. They are separated by small rivers, which sometimes form deep valleys.
 In the South there is the Danube valley, very wide, with ponds and small channels.

Beside the Danube, the main river crossing the county is the Olt River which flows into the Danube close to the village of Islaz. Other important rivers are: the Vedea River, the Teleorman River, and the Călmățui River.

Neighbours

Giurgiu County to the east.
Olt County to the west.
Argeș County and Dâmbovița County to the North.
Bulgaria to the South – Veliko Tarnovo Province, Pleven Province, and Ruse Province.

Economy
The predominant industries in the county are:
 Food and beverages industry.
 Textile industry.
 Chemical industry.
 Mechanical components industry; in Alexandria there is a big roll-bearing enterprise.

Agriculture is the main occupation in the county. Both extensive agriculture, and small scale — vegetables and fruits for the Bucharest markets — is practiced. The area is well suited for irrigations.

Tourism

The county doesn't have many spectacular attractions, but its cultural folk heritage is very rich. Many Romanian personalities have been born here, some of them later describing the life in a village in a very picturesque way. Also, the area was one of the places where the Wallachian Revolution of 1848 unfolded.

The main tourist destinations are:
 The city of Alexandria.
 Fishing on the Danube and other lakes or ponds.

Politics
The Teleorman County Council, renewed at the 2020 local elections, consists of 32 counsellors, with the following party composition:

Administrative divisions

 
Teleorman County has 3 municipalities, 2 towns and 92 communes
Municipalities
Alexandria - capital city; population: 42,129 (as of 2011)
Roșiorii de Vede
Turnu Măgurele
Towns
Videle
Zimnicea - the southernmost locality in Romania

Communes

Băbăița
Balaci
Beciu
Beuca
Blejești
Bogdana
Botoroaga
Bragadiru
Brânceni
Bujoreni
Bujoru
Buzescu
Călinești
Călmățuiu
Călmățuiu de Sus
Cervenia
Ciolănești
Ciuperceni
Conțești
Cosmești
Crângu
Crevenicu
Crângeni
Didești
Dobrotești
Dracea
Drăcșenei
Drăgănești de Vede
Drăgănești-Vlașca
Fântânele
Frăsinet
Frumoasa
Furculești
Gălăteni
Gratia
Islaz
Izvoarele
Lisa
Lița
Lunca
Măgura
Măldăeni
Mârzănești
Mavrodin
Mereni
Moșteni
Nanov
Năsturelu
Necșești
Nenciulești
Olteni
Orbeasca
Peretu
Piatra
Pietroșani
Plopii-Slăvitești
Plosca
Poeni
Poroschia
Purani
Putineiu
Rădoiești
Răsmirești
Săceni
Saelele
Salcia
Sârbeni
Scrioaștea
Scurtu Mare
Seaca
Segarcea-Vale
Sfințești
Siliștea
Siliștea Gumești
Slobozia Mândra
Smârdioasa
Stejaru
Ștorobăneasa
Suhaia
Talpa
Tătărăștii de Jos
Tătărăștii de Sus
Țigănești
Traian
Trivalea-Moșteni
Troianul
Uda-Clocociov
Vârtoape
Vedea
Viișoara
Vitănești
Zâmbreasca

People
Natives of Teleorman County include:
 Marin Preda
 Zaharia Stancu 
 Liviu Dragnea
 Gala Galaction 
 Constantin Noica

Historical county

Historically, the county was located in the southern part of Greater Romania, in the southwestern part of the historical region of Muntenia. Its capital was Turnu Măgurele. The county was bordered on the west by the counties Romanați County and Olt County, to the north by Argeș County, to the east by Vlașca County, and in the south across the Danube River by the Kingdom of Bulgaria. Its territory coincides in large part with that of the present county.

Administration

The county was originally divided into five administrative districts (plăși):

Plasa Alexandria, headquartered at Alexandria
Plasa Balaci, headquartered at Balaci
Plasa Roșiori de Vede, headquartered at Roșiori de Vede
Plasa Turnu Măgurele, headquartered at Turnu Măgurele
Plasa Zimnicea, headquartered at Zimnicea

Subsequently, the county established three more districts:Plasa Călmățuiu, headquartered at Călmățuiu
Plasa Slăvești, headquartered at Slăvești
Plasa Vârtoapele de Sus, headquartered at Vârtoapele de Sus

The county contained four urban communes: Turnu Măgurele, Alexandria, Roșiorii de Vede, and Zimnicea.

Population 
According to the 1930 census data, the county population was 347,294 inhabitants, ethnically divided as follows: 98.1% Romanians, 1.4% Romanies, as well as other minorities. From the religious point of view, the population was 99.0% Eastern Orthodox, 0.6% Adventist, 0.1% Muslim, as well as other minorities.

Urban population 
In 1930, the county's urban population was 58,632 inhabitants, comprising 94.4% Romanians, 3.3% Romanies, 0.4% Hungarians, 0.4% Jews, as well as other minorities. From the religious point of view, the urban population was composed of 98.1% Eastern Orthodox, 0.6% Muslim, 0.4% Jewish, 0.4% Roman Catholic, as well as other minorities.

References

External links

 
Counties of Romania
Place names of Turkish origin in Romania
1879 establishments in Romania
1938 disestablishments in Romania
1940 establishments in Romania
1950 disestablishments in Romania
1968 establishments in Romania
States and territories established in 1879
States and territories disestablished in 1938
States and territories established in 1940
States and territories disestablished in 1950
States and territories established in 1968